Wilson Earnshaw (20 September 1867 – 24 November 1941) was an English first-class cricketer, who played six matches for Yorkshire County Cricket Club between 1893 and 1896.

Born in Morley, Yorkshire, England, Earnshaw was a wicket-keeper who took six catches and completed two stumpings and scored 44 runs, with a top score of 23, at an average of 11.  He played for Yorkshire in a non first-class game in 1890, and for their Second XI in 1897.

Earnshaw died in November 1941 in Low Town, Pudsey, Yorkshire.

References

External links
Cricinfo Profile
Cricket Archive Statistics

Yorkshire cricketers
1867 births
1941 deaths
Cricketers from Morley, West Yorkshire
English cricketers